Yo Yo, original title Yoyo, is a 1965 French comedy film directed by and starring Pierre Étaix. The story follows the son of a millionaire from the 1920s to the 1960s. After losing his fortune in the stock-exchange crash, he teams up with an equestrienne and becomes a circus clown. The film was entered into the 1965 Cannes Film Festival.

Plot
Yo Yo is the son of a 1920s billionaire who, although having everything he fancies and living in a cavernous old castle, is not happy, fancying the simple life of a beautiful circus actress. When the stock-exchange crashes, rendering him both poor and free, he joins the circus where his love interest is performing, and falls madly in love. They have a son who starts in the circus as a clown but later becomes a successful actor and uses his new wealth to buy back his father's castle.

Cast

 Pierre Étaix as Yoyo / the millionaire
 Claudine Auger as Isolina
 Philippe Dionnet as Yoyo as a child
 Luce Klein as the equestrienne
 Siam as a clown
 Pipo as a clown
 Dario as a clown
 Mimile as a clown
 Martine de Breteuil as Madame de Briac
 Roger Trapp as Leroy

Release
The film was released in French cinemas on 19 February 1965. It competed at the 1965 Cannes Film Festival, where it received the OCIC Award. It was released in the United States on 28 February 1967 through Magna Pictures Distribution.

Reception
The film received some harsh reviews in France, which affected Étaix's next film, As Long as You've Got Your Health. Jean-Luc Godard included Yo Yo on his top-ten list of the best films of 1965. The American comedian Jerry Lewis saw the film during a visit to France and enjoyed it so much that he asked to meet its creator. A French television team that had been appointed to interview Lewis captured the meeting, where the two comedians, limited by the language barrier, made impressions of each other's comedy routines and improvised clown acts together. Lewis later cast Étaix in his own unreleased film The Day the Clown Cried.

Bosley Crowther of The New York Times reviewed the film upon the American release:
Mr. Etaix is marvelously talented. He is a master of subtle mimicry, and he plays all sorts of charming little incidents with great sensitivity and wit. ... But that's the trouble with his picture. It's too casual, fragmented and loose. It's as though Mr. Etaix were writing his script as he goes along, tossing in scenes he remembers from somebody else's film, letting himself do something (he also plays several minor roles without taking credit for them) more to display his virtuosity than to develop a story and character.

In 2007, Time Out London described the film as "possibly the best of Etaix's features", and wrote that "Etaix has just enough astringency to keep sentimentality at bay, and his mastery of the sight gag amply justifies Jerry Lewis' enthusiasm for the film, which is singularly beautifully shot by Jean Boffety."

References

External links 
 
 

1965 films
1965 comedy films
Circus films
1960s French-language films
French black-and-white films
Films directed by Pierre Étaix
Films set in the 1920s
Films set in the 1930s
Films set in the 1940s
Films with screenplays by Jean-Claude Carrière
French World War II films
French comedy films